Moyer Site is an historic site in Keens Mills, Maine.

The site was added to the National Historic Register on November 14, 1992, and is also known as "Site #36.28, Maine Archeological Survey."

References

Archaeological sites on the National Register of Historic Places in Maine
Geography of Androscoggin County, Maine
Turner, Maine
National Register of Historic Places in Androscoggin County, Maine